The Drummer of Tacuari is a 1948 Argentine historical drama film, directed by Carlos F. Borcosque and written by Hugo Mac Dougall. It was premiered on July 6, 1948.

The film's plot takes place shortly after the May Revolution, when a young man leaves his realist uncle and becomes a drummer for the revolutionary army.

Cast
  Juan Carlos Barbieri
  Francisco Martínez Allende
  Ricardo Canales
  Norma Giménez
  Leticia Scury
  Homero Cárpena
  Cirilo Etulain
  Manolo Díaz
  Julián Bourges
  Jorge Villoldo
  Ada Cornaro
  Mario Vanarelli
  Félix Gil
  Raúl Miller
  Héctor Rodríguez
  Francisco Gada
  Ricardo Trigo
  Miguel Abeledo
  Omar Nardi
  José Castro
  Francisco Audenino
  Carlos Castro Madero
  Iván Grondona
  Roberto Torres
  Mario Pocoví

References

External links
 

1948 films
1940s Spanish-language films
Argentine black-and-white films
Films directed by Carlos F. Borcosque
Argentine historical films
1940s historical films
1940s Argentine films